1 Samuel 31 is the thirty-first (and the last) chapter of the First Book of Samuel in the Old Testament of the Christian Bible or the first part of the Books of Samuel in the Hebrew Bible. According to Jewish tradition, the book was attributed to the prophet Samuel, with additions by the prophets Gad and Nathan, but modern scholars view it as a composition of a number of independent texts of various ages from c. 630–540 BCE. This chapter contains the account of Saul's repeated attempts to kill him. This is within a section comprising 1 Samuel 16 to 2 Samuel 5 which records the rise of David as the king of Israel.

Text
This chapter was originally written in the Hebrew language. It is divided into 13 verses.

Textual witnesses
Some early manuscripts containing the text of this chapter in Hebrew are of the Masoretic Text tradition, which includes the Codex Cairensis (895), Aleppo Codex (10th century), and Codex Leningradensis (1008). Fragments containing parts of this chapter in Hebrew were found among the Dead Sea Scrolls including 4Q51 (4QSam; 100–50 BCE) with extant verses 1–4. Plate XIII of 4Q51 contains traces of verse 13, separated to 2 Samuel 1:1 with an open line.

Extant ancient manuscripts of a translation into Koine Greek known as the Septuagint (originally was made in the last few centuries BCE) include Codex Vaticanus (B; B; 4th century) and Codex Alexandrinus (A; A; 5th century).

Old Testament references
: , 
:

Places 

Bethshan
Jabesh-Gilead
Jordan River
Mount Gilboa

The death of Saul and his three sons (31:1–10)
While David defeated the Amalekites, Saul and his army were defeated by the Philistines, contrasting David's success (with divine guidance and protection) in saving the lives of his own family and others with Saul's failure resulting in the death of his family, with many others, in battle. Toward the end of the battle on Mount Gilboa Saul's three sons, Jonathan, Abinadab, and Malchishua were killed and Saul himself was wounded. He asked his trustworthy personal armor-bearer to kill him before the Philistines came, but due to his respect for Saul as YHWH's anointed, the armor-bearer refused, so Saul committed suicide. Saul's dishonorable end was followed by the total defeat to his troops, while other Israelites not in battle (suggesting that Saul did not have all Israel behind him) fled from the neighboring areas leaving their towns and villages for the Philistines to occupy, and the disrespectful fate of his body: beheaded, his armor taken into the temple of Astarte (the chief goddess of Beth-shan) then hanged to the wall of Bethshan for public display (1 Chronicles 10:10 states that his head was fastened to the temple of Dagon).

Verse 2
Then the Philistines followed hard after Saul and his sons. And the Philistines killed Jonathan, Abinadab, and Malchishua, Saul’s sons 

Verse 4Then Saul said to his armorbearer, "Draw your sword, and thrust me through with it, lest these uncircumcised men come and thrust me through and abuse me."But his armorbearer would not, for he was greatly afraid. Therefore Saul took a sword and fell on it."Abuse": or "torture".

Jabesh-gilead’s tribute to Saul (31:11–13)

The men of Jabesh-gilead, remembering Saul's action on their behalf (1 Samuel 11:1–13), came to take the bodies of Saul and his sons for cremation and burial, a more honorable treatment than that of the Philistines to the bodies of Saul and his sons.

Verses 12–13 All the valiant men arose, and went all night, and took the body of Saul and the bodies of his sons from the wall of Bethshan, and came to Jabesh, and burnt them there. And they took their bones, and buried them under a tree at Jabesh, and fasted seven days.''
Cross reference: 1 Chronicles 10:12
The brave action of the men, marching from Jabesh-Gilead to Beth-Shan and back (about  one way), recalls the high point of Saul's leadership at the beginning of his reign when he saved the people of Jabesh-Gilead from foreign attacks (1 Samuel 11).

See also

Related Bible parts: 1 Samuel 28, 1 Samuel 29, 2 Samuel 1, 1 Chronicles 10

Notes

References

Sources

Commentaries on Samuel

General

External links
 Jewish translations:
 Shmuel I - I Samuel - Chapter 31 (Judaica Press). Hebrew text and English translation [with Rashi's commentary] at Chabad.org
 Christian translations:
 Online Bible at GospelHall.org (ESV, KJV, Darby, American Standard Version, Bible in Basic English)
 1 Samuel chapter 31. Bible Gateway

31